Arachnospila minutula is a spider wasp that lives in parts of the Palaearctic.

References 

Hymenoptera of Europe
Pompilinae
Insects described in 1842
Taxa named by Anders Gustaf Dahlbom